Amsterdam Memorial Hospital is a 19th-century-founded medical facility in upstate New York that merged in 2009 with a nearby hospital, using part of a $20 million state grant to pay off accumulated debt.

History
The 1889-founded Amsterdam merged with the 1903-founded St Mary's Hospital, a nearby hospital, in 2009.

The Amsterdam Memorial facility is primarily for pediatrics and primary care. They had a prior arrangement, initiated in 1993, whereby obstetrical services for its patients were performed at St. Mary's.

References

  

Hospitals in New York (state)
Hospitals established in 1889